Hüseyin Er (14 January 1985 – 16 May 2021) was a deaf Turkish-born footballer who grew up and mostly lived in London. He was a member of the Turkey national deaf football team.

Private life
Er was born to Haydar and Çiçek in Göksun, Kahramanmaraş Province, southern Turkey in 1985. He had eight siblings, of whom four are also deaf. He had a twin brother, Hasan, who also became a football player. The family migrated to the United Kingdom when he was two years old.

Club career
Er started playing football at a very young age. Memnos Costi, a deaf footballer and  coach, who knew the twin brothers since their age of six, taught them to play football. At 14, the quick-learning boy became a member of Tottenham Deaf Football Club (DFC). He then played for  Arsenal DFC, and also for  St John's DFC. With St John's DFC, he won all of the domestic trophies.

In 2012, Er transferred from the British Arsenal DFC to the 2011–12 Turkish league champion Kartal Municipality DFC in Istanbul, Turkey together with his brother Ali. In the second half of the 2019–20 season, he transferred to İzmirspor in the Turkish Regional Amateur League.

International career
Er became a member of the Turkey deaf football team in 2006.During his career, his national team took the runners-up position at the 2008 World Championships and EuroDeaf 2011, and champion titles at the World Championships (2012, 2016), 2017 Deaflympics, and European Championships (2015, 2019). He was named Best Player of the 2008 World Championships.

Er played at the 2017 Summer Deaflympics held in Samsun, Turkey. He scored one goal in the match against Italy, and two goals against Saudi Arabia. At the EuroDeaf 2019 in Heraklion, Greece, he netted four goals in total.

Er took part in the Group F of the qualification round for the EuroDeaf 2019 held in Wales. The opponents were Bosnia and Herzegovina, Sweden, and Wales.

Death
Er died from a heart attack after a training session in London at the age of 36 on 16 May 2021. He was interred at Lavender Hill Cemetery in Enfield, London. His family later held a memorial and religious service at the London Alevi Cultural Centre and Cem-Evi.

Honours

Individual
 Best player (1): 2008 World

International
Turkey national deaf football team
Champions (4): 2012 World, EuroDeaf 2015, 2016 World, 2017 Deaflympics, EuroDeaf 2019
Runners-up (1): 2008 World, EuroDeaf 2011

References

1985 births
2021 deaths
People from Göksun
Turkish Alevis
Turkish deaf people
Sportspeople from Kahramanmaraş
Turkish emigrants to the United Kingdom
English people of Turkish descent
Sportspeople from London
English deaf people
Deaf association football players
Turkish footballers
İzmirspor footballers
Association football forwards
Players of deaf football
Association football players who died while playing
Sport deaths in England